Rancho de los Quiotes, today known as the Leo Carrillo Historic Park, is a historic estate near Carlsbad, California. The rancho was built as a weekend retreat for actor Leo Carrillo, who designed the property in the style of Spanish hacienda estates. Situated on land once inhabited by the Luiseño people, the original  were located on an old Spanish land grant. Carrillo purchased  for $17 an acre in 1937, adding additional acreage two years later. Over the next few years he designed and built a working rancho (Spanish style ranch) in tribute to his family, the Carrillo family of California, who arrived in California in the 1700s.

There are 17 contributing properties on the ranch, including the main adobe house and "Deedie's house", a smaller adobe artist studio built especially for his wife Edith

Gallery

See also
California Historical Landmarks in San Diego County, California
National Register of Historic Places listings in San Diego County, California

References

External links

City of Carlsbad: Leo Carrillo Ranch Historic Park
Friends of Carrillo Ranch, Inc.
NPS Rancho De Los Kiotes

Buildings and structures in San Diego County, California
Adobe buildings and structures in California
History of San Diego County, California
California Historical Landmarks
National Register of Historic Places in San Diego County, California
Tourist attractions in San Diego County, California